Marguerite Viel (1894-1976) was a French filmmaker who was active during the late 1920s and 1930s. She wrote and directed several films, including Occupe-toi d’Amélie (1932) and La banque Nemo (1934). Viel was also a frequent collaborator of Jean Epstein, lending financial support to many of Epstein's films.

Viel  worked as a dialogue writer and sound editor during the first years of sound film. As a sound editor, she was responsible for the French dubbing of non-French films.

Filmography

As writer or director

In other roles

References

French women film directors
French women film producers
Sound editors
French filmmakers